The duathlon competition at the 2019 Southeast Asian Games in the Philippines was held at the Subic Bay Freeport Zone from 2 to 5 December 2019.

Competition schedule
The men's and women's individual race took place on 2 December 2019. The mixed relay event was originally scheduled to take place on 4 December 2019 but was rescheduled to take place earlier on 2 December 2019 due to the anticipated weather caused by Typhoon Kanmuri (Tisoy).

All times are Philippine Standard Time (UTC+8).

Medal summary

Medal table

Events

Participating nations
A total of athletes from 6 nations were scheduled to participate (the numbers of athletes are shown in parentheses).

Results

Men's individual
Key
Running denotes the time it took the athlete to complete the running leg
Cycling denotes the time it took the athlete to complete the cycling leg
Running denotes the time it took the athlete to complete the running leg
Difference denotes the time difference between the athlete and the event winner
* The total time includes both transitions

Women's individual
Key
Running denotes the time it took the athlete to complete the running leg
Cycling denotes the time it took the athlete to complete the cycling leg
Running denotes the time it took the athlete to complete the running leg
Difference denotes the time difference between the athlete and the event winner
* The total time includes both transitions

Mixed relay

References

External links
 

2019

Southeast Asian Games
2019 Southeast Asian Games events
Duathlon competitions